Joe Beef is a restaurant in Montreal, Quebec, Canada. The owners describe the cuisine as “Bocusian-Lyonnaise cuisine du marché (French market cuisine).” It's located in the neighbourhood of Little Burgundy, in the borough of Le Sud Ouest.

History

Joe Beef was opened on September 19, 2005 by David McMillan, Frederic Morin, and Allison Cunningham with financial guidance and investment by Jeff Baikowitz and David Lisbona. The restaurant took over the location of Café Miguel.

The restaurant's name is a homage to Montreal's infamous Joe Beef, an alias for Charles McKiernan. McKiernan, who owned a tavern that served many lower class laborers in Montreal, “died in his canteen of a heart attack at the age of 54.” McKiernan's generosity and gluttony may have inspired the concept of Joe Beef restaurant, which challenges the conventions of fine French dining.

As of November 25th 2021 co-founder David McMillan had announced retirement citing burnout and stress after 32 years in the restaurant industry stating, "I never want to shave white truffles on to asparagus for someone from Toronto ever again in my life". McMillan has since sold his shares to fellow co-founders and co-partners Fred Morin and Allison Cunningham.

Offerings 

The menu at Joe Beef changes every dinner service, usually according to the produce sourced from Atwater Market and other local suppliers.

Products 
Federic Morin and David McMillan, along with Meredith Erickson, have released two cookbooks: The Art of Living According to Joe Beef: A Cookbook of Sorts and Joe Beef: Surviving the Apocalypse: Another Cookbook of Sorts, which won Gold at the 2019 Taste Canada Awards. The cookbooks include recipes from the restaurants and homes of the Joe Beef owners.

References

External links
Joe Beef

2005 establishments in Quebec
Le Sud-Ouest
Restaurants established in 2005
Restaurants in Montreal